David Chaim Rubinsztein  (born 1963) FRS FMedSci is the Deputy Director of the Cambridge Institute of Medical Research (CIMR),  Professor of Molecular Neurogenetics at the University of Cambridge and a UK Dementia Research Institute Professor.

Education
Rubinsztein completed his Bachelor of Medicine, Bachelor of Surgery (MB ChB) in 1986 and PhD in 1993 in the Medical Research Council/University of Cape Town Unit for the Cell Biology of Atherosclerosis. In 1993 he went to Cambridge as a senior registrar in Genetic Pathology.

Career
In 1997, Rubinsztein acquired his Certificate of Completion of Specialist Training at the University of Cambridge. He was appointed to a Personal Readership at the University of Cambridge in 2003. In 2005, he was promoted to Professor of Molecular Neurogenetics at the University of Cambridge (personal chair). He has been an author on more than 300 scientific papers, and was ranked as the 4th most cited European author from 2007 to 2013 in cell biology. Rubinsztein has been invited to give talks at major international conferences, including Gordon Research Conferences and Keystone Symposia.

Research
Rubinsztein has made major contributions to the field of neurodegeneration with his laboratory's discovery that autophagy regulates the levels of intracytoplasmic aggregate-prone proteins that cause many neurodegenerative diseases, including Huntington's, Parkinson's and Alzheimer's disease. His lab has found that autophagy may be inhibited in various neurodegenerative diseases and has elucidated the pathological consequences of autophagy compromise. In addition his research has advanced the basic understanding of autophagy, identifying the plasma membrane as a source of autophagosome membrane and characterising early events in autophagosome biogenesis,. Furthermore, he studied how lysosomal positioning regulates autophagy. His goal is to understand the links between these diseases and autophagy. He is currently focused on understanding how to induce autophagy in vivo to remove toxic proteins and avoid the development of neurodegenerative disease

Honours and awards
Rubinsztein has won numerous awards including:

1997 Glaxo-Wellcome Fellowship
2001 Medical Research Council (MRC) Programme grant, Wellcome Trust Senior Clinical Fellowship
2004 Elected a Fellow of the Academy of Medical Sciences (FMedSci)
2005 Professor of Molecular Neurogenetics, University of Cambridge
2006 MRC Programme grant, Wellcome Trust Senior Clinical Fellowship
2007 Graham Bull Prize for Clinical Science by the Royal College of Physicians
2011  Member of the European Molecular Biology Organization (EMBO)
2012 Wellcome Trust Principal Fellowship
2013 Deputy Director of Cambridge Institute for Medical Research, University of Cambridge
2014 Thomson Reuters' Highly Cited Researchers 2014 in the categories Biology and Biochemistry and Molecular Biology and Genetics
2015 Thomson Reuters' Highly Cited Researchers 2015 in the categories Biology and Biochemistry
2015 Academic Lead of ARUK Cambridge Drug Discovery Institute
2015 4th highest cited cell biologist in Europe and Israel for articles published between 2007 and 2013
2016 Awarded Thudichum Medal from Biochemical Society for 2017
2017 Elected a Fellow of the Royal Society
2017 UK Dementia Research Institute Professor
2018 Awarded Prix Roger de Spoelberch for 2017
2018 Clarivate Analytics Highly Cited Researcher 2018
2019 Clarivate Analytics Highly Cited Researcher 2019
2020 Awarded Goudie Medal and lecture from Pathological Society of Great Britain & Ireland
2020 Clarivate Analytics Highly Cited Researcher 2020
2021 Clarivate Analytics Highly Cited Researcher 2021
2022 Elected member of Academia Europaea, The Academy of Europe
2022 Clarivate Analytics Highly Cited Researcher 2022

References

1963 births
Wellcome Trust Principal Research Fellows
University of Cape Town alumni
Fellows of the Royal Society
Fellows of the Academy of Medical Sciences (United Kingdom)
Members of the European Molecular Biology Organization
British medical researchers
British neuroscientists
British geneticists
Living people